Aime Hansen (born 16 August 1962) is an Estonian poet, writer, and artist. She is noted for her works with religious themes and her exploration of the mysticism of life and psychology. In 2009 she authored  Jaipur-Delhi-Himaalaja: reisikohvrist leitud lood, a short story collection related to her travels in northern India and the Himalayas. A member of the Estonian Writer's Union, she writes in both Estonian and English.

Works
 "Koduaja tuul", Eesti Raamat (1982)
 "Kalade kuninga maa", Eesti Raamat (1988), 
 "Teekond madude saarele", (1990)
 "Jaipur-Delhi-Himaalaja: reisikohvrist leitud lood", Varrak (2009)
 "Ma olin mereingel", Verb (2011)
 "Eestlasena Londonis: kübar jalas, saabas peas", Ajakirjade Kirjastus (2011)
 "Uus-Meremaa sõnas ja pildis", Go Group (2011)

References

External links
Biography at Varrak 

Estonian women poets
1962 births
Living people
University of Tartu alumni
20th-century Estonian poets
21st-century Estonian poets
Writers from Tallinn